Negative Branch Reservations is an emerging phenomenon from Eliyahu Goldratt's Theory of Constraints. A Negative Branch Reservation is a cause and effect analysis of a situation. This thinking skill is used to map out what can go wrong in a process of change and help to anticipate any negative outcomes.  This technique uses these forms in its analysis Thinking Processes of the theory: Future Reality Tree, Transition Tree, or Prerequisite Tree.

References
 

Theory of constraints